Athletics events were contested at the 1963 Summer Universiade in Porto Alegre, Brazil.

Medal summary

Men

Women

Medal table

References
World Student Games (Universiade - Men) - GBR Athletics
World Student Games (Universiade - Women) - GBR Athletics

Athletics at the Summer Universiade
Uni
1963 Summer Universiade